Clare Wharton Woolwine (September 1, 1888 in Nashville, Tennessee – October 4, 1939 in Los Angeles, California) served in the California legislature representing the 63rd Assembly District from 1927 to 1931 and the 44th district from 1933 to 1935. During World War I he served in the United States Army.

References

1888 births
1939 deaths
United States Army personnel of World War I
20th-century American politicians
Republican Party members of the California State Assembly